is a city located in Osaka Prefecture, Japan. , the city had an estimated population of 108803 in 51632 households and a population density of 1200 persons per km².

Geography
Tondabayashi is located in the southeastern part of Osaka Prefecture.The northeastern part of the city is flat, and the Ishikawa River passes through the town. The southern part of the city is hilly, rising gradually to the Kongō Range and Katsuragi Mountains.

Neighboring municipalities
Osaka Prefecture
Sakai
Habikino
Kawachinagano
Ōsakasayama
Taishi
Kanan
Chihayaakasaka

Climate
Tondabayashi has a Humid subtropical climate (Köppen Cfa) characterized by warm summers and cool winters with light to no snowfall.  The average annual temperature in Tondabayashi is 14.2 °C. The average annual rainfall is 1475 mm with September as the wettest month. The temperatures are highest on average in August, at around 26.3 °C, and lowest in January, at around 2.7 °C.

Demographics
Per Japanese census data, the population of Tondabayashi has increased rapidly in the 1960s and 1970s, and peaked at around the year 2000.

History
The area of the modern city of Tondabayashi was within ancient Kawachi Province. During the Sengoku period, it developed as a temple town centered on the Buddhist temple of Kosho-ji Betsu-in. The village of Tondabayashi was established within Ishikawa District with the creation of the modern municipalities system on April 1, 1889.  On April 1, 1896 the area became part of Minamikawachi District, Osaka. Tondabayashi was promoted to town status on August 1, 1896 and to city status on April 1, 1950.

Government
Tondabayashi has a mayor-council form of government with a directly elected mayor and a unicameral city council of 18 members. Tondabayashi collectively with the city of Ōsakasayama, and other municipalities of Minamikawachi District contributes two members  to the Osaka Prefectural Assembly. In terms of national politics, the city is part of Osaka 15th district of the lower house of the Diet of Japan.

Economy
The city is an agricultural region, with eggplants, strawberries, cucumbers as major crops. Traditionally, the area is known for its production of bamboo blinds.

Education
Tondabayashi has 16 public elementary schools and eight public middle schools operated by the city government and three public high schools operated by the Osaka Prefectural Department of Education. There are also one private elementary school, two private middle schools and two private high school. The prefecture also operated one special education school for the handicapped. Osaka Ohtani University is located in Tondabayashi and Aino University has a campus in the city. PL Gakuen Women's Junior College was active 1974 to 2009.

Transportation

Railway
 Kintetsu Railway – Kintetsu Nagano Line
  -  -  -  - 
 Nankai Electric Railway -    Koya Line

Highway

Local attractions
Tondabayashi Jinaimachi,  Important Preservation Districts for Groups of Traditional Buildings 
 Ryusen-ji, National Place of Scenic Beauty
Takidani Fudomyoo-ji
Kosho-ji Betsu-in
Shindō temple ruins and Okameishi Kofun, National Historic Sites
PL Art of Fireworks Display

Sister city relations
 - Bethlehem, Pennsylvania, United States
 - Pengzhou, Sichuan Province, China

Noted people from Tondabayashi
Harumi Fujita, composer
Tadamitsu Kishimoto, scientist
Chieko Naniwa, actress
Tsuneyasu Miyamoto, football coach and player

References

External links

 Tondabayashi City official website 

 
Cities in Osaka Prefecture